Waterhead is a civil parish in the Carlisle district of Cumbria, England.  It contains eight listed buildings that are recorded in the National Heritage List for England.  All the listed buildings are designated at Grade II, the lowest of the three grades, which is applied to "buildings of national importance and special interest".  Hadrian's Wall passes through the parish, which is mainly rural.  The listed buildings are all houses, farmhouses, or farm buildings.


Buildings

References

Citations

Sources

Lists of listed buildings in Cumbria